Frank John Drews (May 25, 1916 – April 22, 1972) was a Major League Baseball second baseman who played for the Boston Braves in 1944 and 1945.

Drews is one of many ballplayers who only appeared in the major leagues during World War II.  He made his major league debut on August 13, 1944 in a road doubleheader against the Pittsburgh Pirates at Forbes Field.  His last game for Boston was on August 5, 1945.

He was a typical example of what Mike González termed "good field, no hit."  Career totals include 95 games played, a .205 batting average (59-for-288), 29 runs batted in, and 27 runs scored.  41 walks and 1 hit by pitch, however, did push his on-base percentage up to .306.  On defense, he had a .967 fielding percentage, which was just above the league average for his era.

Drews died in his hometown of Buffalo, New York at the age of 55.

Trivia
Drews was born in the same week as Braves infielder John Dudra. (May 21–27, 1916)

External links 

Retrosheet

1916 births
1972 deaths
Major League Baseball second basemen
Baseball players from New York (state)
Boston Braves players
Leesburg Gondoliers players
Leesburg Anglers players
Jacksonville Tars players
St. Paul Saints (AA) players
Newark Bears (IL) players
Indianapolis Indians players
Syracuse Chiefs players
Burials in Buffalo, New York